The Argonaute class was a class of two 74-gun ships of the French Navy, built to a common design by naval constructor François-Guillaume Clairin-Deslauriers. The design was lengthened by 4feet 9½ inches (4½ pieds) from the designer's previous Scipion class, which had been found to lack stability. The designer died on 10 October 1780, and the construction of these ships was completed by Jean-Denis Chevillard, who was appointed his successor as ingénieur-constructeur en chef at that dockyard in July 1781.

Ships 
Argonaute
Builder: Rochefort Dockyard
Ordered: June 1779
Begun: August 1779
Launched: 5 June 1781
Completed: December 1781
Fate: Cut down (raséed) to a 'heavy' frigate 1793-94 and renamed Flibustier; disarmed in December 1795 and later taken to pieces.

Brave 
Builder: Lorient Dockyard
Ordered: June 1779
Begun: October 1779
Launched: 6 June 1781
Completed: November 1781
Fate: Cut down (raséed) to a 'heavy' frigate 1793-94 (but not renamed); reduced to a hulk at Brest in January 1798, and later taken to pieces.

Notes and references

References

Bibliography 
 
Winfield, Rif and Roberts, Stephen S. (2017) French Warships in the Age of Sail 1626–1786: Design, Construction, Careers and Fates. Seaforth Publishing. .
Winfield, Rif and Roberts, Stephen S. (2015) French Warships in the Age of Sail 1786-1861: Design, Construction, Careers and Fates. Seaforth Publishing. .

 
74-gun ship of the line classes
Ship of the line classes from France
Ship classes of the French Navy